Kevin Daum is an author, columnist, entrepreneurship coach, marketer, and speaker. He currently writes for Inc.com, but his columns have also appeared in the Huffington Post, Leader2Leader Magazine, and Smart Business Magazine.

Background 
Born and raised in Los Angeles, Daum graduated in 1986 from Humboldt State University with a degree in theatre arts. He graduated from the MIT Enterprise Forum, Entrepreneurial Masters program in 2001. Daum founded and operated Stratford Financial Services in 1989, grew the company to become an Inc. 500 company in 1999, and then sold it in 2007. He also founded and sold an entertainment venture, Mystery is Served, in 1995. Additionally, Daum founded TAE International in 2008.

Career 
Daum has authored several books including "ROAR! Get Heard in the Sales and Marketing Jungle" published by Wiley in 2010 and "Video Marketing For Dummies" published by Wiley in 2012. His book "Green$ense For the Home: Rating the Real Payoff on 50 Green Home Projects", co-authored with Eric Corey Freed (Taunton), won an American Society of Journalists and Author's (ASJA) Outstanding Book Award in 2011.

He has held board positions for the Entrepreneur's Organization and was a founding member of its Silicon Valley chapter.

In 2006, Daum was named Humboldt State University's Distinguished Alum of the Year.

Bibliography 
"What the Banks Won’t Tell You",Grady Parsons, 2004
"Building Your Own Home For Dummies" with Peter Economy and Janice Brewster, John Wiley & Sons, 2005
"Green$ense for the Home: Rating the Real Payoff from 50 Green Home Projects" with Eric Corey Freed, Taunton Publishers, 2010
"ROAR" Get Heard in the Sales and Marketing Jungle" With Daniel Turner, John Wiley & Sons, 2010
"Video Marketing For Dummies" with Matt Scott, Bettina Hein, Andreas Goeldi, John Wiley & Sons, 2012

Notes 

American columnists
Living people
Year of birth missing (living people)
Writers from Los Angeles
California State Polytechnic University, Humboldt alumni